Meitze is a village in the municipality Wedemark, in Lower Saxony. Meitze covers about 11 square kilometres, including areas used for agriculture and forestry.

General information 
The village is mainly noted for the cobbled high street and a lot of old timber-framed houses in the centre.

In the North, there is a wind farm with twelve wind turbines.

History 
Meitze arose at the crossing point of two important trade routes, the "Hessenweg" and the "Bremerweg". On this intersection, Meitze developed as a well-known marketplace.

 The village was founded in 1330 as "Metce", according to documents.
 1438 - Meitze was mentioned as "Metzenne" in a register.
 around 1791 the name of the town became "Meitze". 
 1921 - the local Schützenverein was founded
 1930 - the volunteer fire brigade was established.
 1959 - the new chapel was consecrated
 since 1974 Meitze has been a district of the Wedemark

On 29 April 1944, ten American airmen were killed when their Consolidated B-24 Liberator aircraft crashed near Meitze. The crew had been ordered to carry out a bombing mission over the German capital of Berlin, according to the U.S. military. Their remains were identified in 2011 and buried at Arlington National Cemetery.

Infrastructure 
About one kilometer (0.6 miles) away from Meitze passes the A7.

Meitze is directly connected with Mellendorf and Elze/Bennemühlen by the bus route 697.

Until 1967 Meitze also had an own elementary school, but it was closed because of a lack of students.

References

External links 
 Pictures of Meitze (German)
 Gemeinde Wedemark (German)

Villages in Lower Saxony